No Ordinary Man is the second studio album by American country music artist Tracy Byrd. It features the singles "The First Step", "Lifestyles of the Not So Rich and Famous", "Watermelon Crawl", and "The Keeper of the Stars", all of which reached the top five on the Hot Country Songs chart. His best-selling album, No Ordinary Man, was certified 2× Platinum by the RIAA for shipments of two million copies in the U.S. Although not a number one, "The Keeper of the Stars" is considered one of Byrd's signature songs.

Track listing

Personnel
Eddie Bayers - drums
Tracy Byrd - lead vocals
Johnny Lee Carpenter - fiddle
Pat Flynn - acoustic guitar
Sonny Garrish - steel guitar
Steve Gibson - acoustic guitar
Greg Gordon - background vocals
Mitch Humphries - piano
David Hungate - bass guitar
John Barlow Jarvis - synthesizer
Brent Mason - electric guitar
Weldon Myrick - steel guitar
Kenny Sears - fiddle
Dennis Wilson - background vocals
Lonnie Wilson - drums
Glenn Worf - bass guitar
Curtis Young - background vocals

Production
Produced By Jerry Crutchfield
Engineers: Craig White, Tim Kish
Assistant Engineers: Terry Bates, Robert Charles
Mixing: Lynn Peterzell, Craig White
Mastering: Hank Williams

Charts

Weekly charts

Year-end charts

Notes 

1994 albums
Tracy Byrd albums
MCA Records albums
Albums produced by Jerry Crutchfield